Rank comparison chart of naval forces of Commonwealth of Nations states.

Enlisted

See also
Comparative navy officer ranks of the Commonwealth
Ranks and insignia of NATO navies' officers

Footnotes

 
Military comparisons